Lars Olof Melker Adolfsson (born 20 December 1965) is a Swedish judoka. He competed in the 1988 and 1992 Summer Olympics.

References

External links
 

1965 births
Living people
Judoka at the 1988 Summer Olympics
Judoka at the 1992 Summer Olympics
Swedish male judoka
Olympic judoka of Sweden
20th-century Swedish people